Povenets is an urban locality (an urban-type settlement) in Medvezhyegorsky District of the Republic of Karelia, Russia, located on the shore of Lake Onega,  north of Petrozavodsk, the capital of the republic. As of the 2010 Census, its population was 2,209.

History

Urban-type settlement status was granted to Povenets in 1938.

Povenets marked the furthest advance by Finnish troops during the World War II Continuation war 1941-44. The town was occupied by Finnish troops on 6 December 1941. Soviet forces retook the town in July 1944.

Administrative and municipal status
Within the framework of administrative divisions, the urban-type settlement of Povenets is subordinated to Medvezhyegorsky District. As a municipal division, Povenets, together with seventeen rural localities, is incorporated within Medvezhyegorsky Municipal District as Povenetskoye Urban Settlement.

References

Notes

Sources

Urban-type settlements in the Republic of Karelia
Medvezhyegorsky District
Povenetsky Uyezd